Veikko Huuskonen (8 February 1910 in Helsinki – 3 June 1973) was a Finnish boxer who competed in the 1936 Summer Olympics.

In 1936 he was eliminated in the first round of the bantamweight class after losing his fight to Alec Hannan of South Africa.

In 1937, Huuskonen won a bronze medal at the European Amateur Boxing Championships in Milan. He beat a Swiss boxer by knockout, with both contestants being praised for technical and stylish boxing. Losing to eventual gold medalist Ulderico Sergo, Huuskonen then won the bronze medal ahead of Antoni Czortek who forfeited. This was the third Finnish medal at the European Championships, after Kaarlo Väkevä and Gunnar Bärlund.

He was a five-time Finnish champion: 1936 (53.5 kg), 1937 (54), 1939 (54), 1940 (54) and 1941 (54). Huuskonen also competed in the widely spectated Swedish–Finnish boxing match. His 21st representative match for Finland came in 1939, when he beat Harry Ljushammar. 7,500 people attended the event in Messuhalli. Following the victory, Hufvudstadsbladet commented that Huuskonen should have been considered for the 1939 European Amateur Boxing Championships.

References

External links
 

1910 births
1973 deaths
Sportspeople from Helsinki
People from Uusimaa Province (Grand Duchy of Finland)
Bantamweight boxers
Olympic boxers of Finland
Boxers at the 1936 Summer Olympics
Finnish male boxers